A quotient group or factor group is a mathematical group obtained by aggregating similar elements of a larger group using an equivalence relation that preserves some of the group structure (the rest of the structure is "factored" out). It is part of the mathematical field known as group theory.

For a congruence relation on a group, the equivalence class of the identity element is always a normal subgroup of the original group, and the other equivalence classes are precisely the cosets of that normal subgroup. (This is pronounced , where  is short for modulo.)

Much of the importance of quotient groups is derived from their relation to homomorphisms.

The dual notion of a quotient group is a subgroup, these being the two primary ways of forming a smaller group from a larger one. Any normal subgroup has a corresponding quotient group, formed from the larger group by eliminating the distinction between elements of the subgroup. In category theory, quotient groups are examples of quotient objects, which are dual to subobjects.

Definition and illustration
Given a group  and a subgroup , and an element , one can consider the corresponding left coset: . Cosets are a natural class of subsets of a group; for example consider the abelian group G of integers, with operation defined by the usual addition, and the subgroup  of even integers.

For a general subgroup , it is desirable to define a compatible group operation on the set of all possible cosets, . This is possible exactly when  is a normal subgroup, see below. A subgroup  of a group  is normal if and only if the coset equality  holds for all .

Definition
Let  be a normal subgroup of a group  . That is, . Since the identity element , . Define a binary operation on the set of cosets, as follows. Then

.

This depends on the fact that N is a normal subgroup. It still remains to be shown that this condition is not only sufficient but necessary to define the operation on G/N.

Since , we have .

Example: Addition modulo 6

For example, consider the group with addition modulo 6: . Consider the subgroup , which is normal because  is abelian. Then the set of (left) cosets is of size three:

 .

The binary operation defined above makes this set into a group, known as the quotient group, which in this case is isomorphic to the cyclic group of order 3.

Motivation for the name "quotient"
The reason  is called a quotient group comes from division of integers.  When dividing 12 by 3 one obtains the answer 4 because one can regroup 12 objects into 4 subcollections of 3 objects. The quotient group is the same idea, although we end up with a group for a final answer instead of a number because groups have more structure than an arbitrary collection of objects.

Because we started with a group and normal subgroup, the final quotient contains more information than just the number of cosets (which is what regular division yields), but instead has a group structure itself.

Examples

Even and odd integers
Consider the group of integers  (under addition) and the subgroup  consisting of all even integers. This is a normal subgroup, because  is abelian. There are only two cosets: the set of even integers and the set of odd integers, and therefore the quotient group  is the cyclic group with two elements. This quotient group is isomorphic with the set  with addition modulo 2; informally, it is sometimes said that  equals the set  with addition modulo 2.

Example further explained...

Then,  when  is even and  when  is odd.
 Let  .
 Note that we have defined ,    is  if  is odd and  if  is even.

Remainders of integer division
A slight generalization of the last example. Once again consider the group of integers  under addition. Let n be any positive integer. Once again  is normal in  because  is abelian. The cosets are the collection . The quotient  can be thought of as the group of "remainders" modulo . This is a cyclic group of order .

Complex integer roots of 1

The twelfth roots of unity, which are points on the complex unit circle, form a multiplicative abelian group , shown on the picture on the right as colored balls with the number at each point giving its complex argument. Consider its subgroup  made of the fourth roots of unity, shown as red balls. This normal subgroup splits the group into three cosets, shown in red, green and blue. One can check that the cosets form a group of three elements (the product of a red element with a blue element is blue, the inverse of a blue element is green, etc.). Thus, the quotient group  is the group of three colors, which turns out to be the cyclic group with three elements.

The real numbers modulo the integers
Consider the group of real numbers  under addition, and the subgroup  of integers. Adding such cosets is done by adding the corresponding real numbers, and subtracting 1 if the result is greater than or equal to 1. The quotient group  is isomorphic to the circle group, the group of complex numbers of absolute value 1 under multiplication, or correspondingly, the group of rotations in 2D about the origin, that is, the special orthogonal group .

Matrices of real numbers
The group  is known as the special linear group .

Integer modular arithmetic
Consider the abelian group  (that is, the set  with addition modulo 4), and its subgroup .

Integer multiplication
Consider the multiplicative group .

Properties

The mapping  is sometimes called the canonical projection of  onto .

Several important properties of quotient groups are recorded in the fundamental theorem on homomorphisms and the isomorphism theorems.

This result can also be stated as "any subgroup of index 2 is normal", and in this form it applies also to infinite groups.

This is a special case of the extension problem.

Quotients of Lie groups
In this case, the original group  has the structure of a fiber bundle (specifically, a principal -bundle), with base space  and fiber . The dimension of  equals .

Note that the condition that  is closed is necessary. Indeed, if  is not closed then the quotient space is not a T1-space (since there is a coset in the quotient which cannot be separated from the identity by an open set), and thus not a Hausdorff space.

For a non-normal Lie subgroup , the space  of left cosets is not a group, but simply a differentiable manifold on which  acts.  The result is known as a homogeneous space.

See also
Group extension
Quotient category
Short exact sequence

Notes

References
 
 

Group theory
Group